Francis Fox  (born December 2, 1939) is a former member of the Senate of Canada, Canadian Cabinet minister, and Principal Secretary in the Prime Minister's Office, and thus was a senior aide to Prime Minister Paul Martin. He also worked as a lobbyist in the 1980s.

Life and career
Born in Montreal, Quebec, Fox is a lawyer by training. He was first elected to the House of Commons of Canada in the 1972 election as a Liberal Member of Parliament (MP) for the riding of Argenteuil—Deux-Montagnes, Quebec. He was re-elected in the 1974 election from the same constituency. In the 1979 and 1980 elections, he was returned as MP for Blainville—Deux-Montagnes before being defeated in that riding in the 1984 election.

Fox was appointed to the Cabinet of Prime Minister Pierre Trudeau in 1976 when he became Solicitor General of Canada. Bilingual, Fox was seen as an up-and-comer in the Liberal cabinet, and even a potential party leader. However, he was forced to resign on January 27, 1978, when it became known that he had forged the signature of his then-girlfriend's husband on a form granting permission for her to have an abortion. Although he was married at the time of the scandal, he subsequently divorced his wife (m. 1965), Joan Pennefather. He later married a subsequent girlfriend, Vivian Case (b. 1950). He is currently married (~1979) to Case, who is an artist, and has three children.

Fox returned to Cabinet after the 1980 election when Trudeau appointed him to the position of Secretary of State for Canada and Minister of Communications. He then served as Minister of International Trade in 1984 in the short-lived government of Trudeau's successor, John Turner.

With the defeat of the Turner government and the loss of his own seat, Fox returned to the private sector. He became a lobbyist, and a member of Government Consultants International, a consulting firm, with Frank Moores, Gary Ouellet, and Gerald Doucet. Subsequently, he was a senior partner in the law firm of Martineau Walker, and later as an executive at Rogers AT&T Wireless.

In 2003, Fox became a senior member of Paul Martin's transition team as he prepared to succeed Jean Chrétien as prime minister. In 2004, Fox became Martin's principal secretary, but it was announced on August 18 that he would be leaving the position on October 1 in order to return to private life.

In private life, Fox served as the president of former minister Liza Frulla's riding. He was an early prominent supporter of former Liberal leader Michael Ignatieff.

Fox was appointed to the Senate on Martin's recommendation on August 29, 2005, and announced his resignation on November 30, 2011, effective December 2.

References

External links
 
Liberal Senate Forum

1939 births
Living people
Anglophone Quebec people
Canadian lawyers
Canadian lobbyists
Canadian King's Counsel
Canadian senators from Quebec
Harvard Law School alumni
Lawyers from Montreal
Liberal Party of Canada MPs
Liberal Party of Canada senators
Members of the 20th Canadian Ministry
Members of the 22nd Canadian Ministry
Members of the 23rd Canadian Ministry
Members of the House of Commons of Canada from Quebec
Members of the King's Privy Council for Canada
Politicians from Montreal
Solicitors General of Canada
21st-century Canadian politicians